Ronald William Willey (1929−2004) was an Australian rugby league footballer and coach. He was a representative for the Australian national side. Post-playing, Willey had a long and successful first grade and State representative coaching career.

Playing career
In 1951, he was appointed captain for four games at the age of 21. Willey held the record as the youngest Canterbury captain until Braith Anasta in 2002. He became the first Canterbury local international when he was selected on the 1952–53 Kangaroo tour, and was the Berries’ standout player in a dark era for the club.

Willey missed most of 1953 and the entire 1954 season through a serious knee injury, but returned to the game as captain-coach of Rockhampton and represented Queensland that season.

He joined Manly-Warringah in 1956 and played a total of 124 games over seven seasons for the club including their unsuccessful 1957 and 1959 Grand Final appearances. In 1956, Willey played two games for New South Wales, but although a player of immense talent, Willey played in an era where Clive Churchill was the incumbent representative fullback, denying Willey many selection opportunities. In his last season as a player at Manly in 1962, Willey was captain-coach. He held the record for the most points scored at Manly until overtaken by Graeme Eadie in the 1970s, and during 1962 he overtook Bernie Purcell's record for the most points scored in an NSWRFL career (1,152); Willey's eventual total of 1,288 stood as the new career record for four seasons until it was bettered by Keith Barnes in 1966.

Willey joined the Parramatta Eels in 1963 but only played seven games before retiring in 1964.

Coaching career

Club coach
Willey returned to Manly in 1970 for a successful five season tenure as a non-playing coach. During this time he guided them to their first New South Wales Rugby League premiership in 1972 and repeated that premiership success in 1973. In this, his second coaching stint at Manly he enjoyed an extraordinary 74% win rate.

Later Willey coached Balmain from 1977 to 1979, North Sydney from 1980 to 1982 and Souths from 1983 to 1985 but was unable to repeat premiership success. His last head coaching role in Australia was with Penrith where he coached the club a fifth-place playoff in 1988 where they lost to Balmain. In his final season at Penrith, Willey guided the club to a second-placed finish but the Panthers were knocked out in straight sets by eventual grand finalists Balmain and Canberra.

Willey coached English side Bradford Northern for a short stint and led them to the Premiership final and success in the Yorkshire Cup in 1989–90.

Willey coached for a total of 17 seasons and 403 matches.

Representative coach
Willey also coached New South Wales to the first ever clean sweep of a State of Origin series against Queensland in 1986.

Personal life
Willey's grandson is fellow rugby league footballer Anthony Don, a fullback/winger who played over 150 games for the Gold Coast Titans from 2013 to 2021.

References

1929 births
2004 deaths
Australia national rugby league team players
Australian rugby league coaches
Australian rugby league players
Balmain Tigers coaches
Bradford Bulls coaches
Canterbury-Bankstown Bulldogs players
Manly Warringah Sea Eagles captains
Manly Warringah Sea Eagles coaches
Manly Warringah Sea Eagles players
New South Wales Rugby League State of Origin coaches
North Sydney Bears coaches
Parramatta Eels players
Penrith Panthers coaches
Rugby league fullbacks
Rugby league players from Sydney
South Sydney Rabbitohs coaches